Ameerega pepperi is a species of poison frogs found in central Peru. It has a red dorsum and is similar morphologically to A. bassleri, A. cainarachi and A. yoshina; but can be distinguished by its advertisement call.

References

Further reading
Acioli, Ellen Cristina Serrão, and Selvino Neckel-Oliveira. "Reproductive biology of Ameerega trivittata (Anura: Dendrobatidae) in an area of terra firme forest in eastern Amazonia." Acta Amazonica 44.4 (2014): 473–480.

External links

pepperi
Amphibians of Peru
Amphibians described in 2009